Penlington may refer to:

 Alfred Penlington, footballer killed during World War II
 Nathan Penlington, Welsh writer, poet, live literature producer and magician
 Ross Penlington (1931–2001), former Court of Appeal Judge in Hong Kong
 William Penlington (mayor) (1832–1899), New Zealand builder and mayor
 William Penlington (teacher) (1890–1982), New Zealand school principal and educationalist

See also
Penington